"What's Made Milwaukee Famous (Has Made a Loser Out of Me)" is a song written by Glenn Sutton. The song's title is a reference to beer, specifically Schlitz beer, which for many years was advertised with the slogan, "The beer that made Milwaukee famous."

In 1968, Jerry Lee Lewis released his version as a single. It became a top-ten hit on Billboard's country chart and made a minor impact on the Billboard Hot 100.

Chart performance

Cover versions
Johnny Bush released a version of the song on his 1968 record "Undo the Right."

In the United Kingdom, a version by Rod Stewart charted at No. 4 in 1972 as a double A-side with "Angel."

The Texas band What Made Milwaukee Famous takes its name from this song.

Irish-American Celtic punk band Flogging Molly included a live cover of the song on their 1997 debut album, Alive Behind the Green Door.

References

1968 songs
1968 singles
Rod Stewart songs
Lynn Anderson songs
Jerry Lee Lewis songs
Songs written by Glenn Sutton
Song recordings produced by Jerry Kennedy
Song recordings produced by Eddie Kilroy
Smash Records singles
Songs about alcohol
Songs about Wisconsin